With the growth of science fiction studies as an academic discipline as well as a popular media genre, a number of libraries, museums, archives, and special collections have been established to collect and organize works of scholarly and historical value in the field.

Key collections

The Merril Collection of Science Fiction, Fantasy, and Speculation is a leading collection of science fiction. It was founded in Toronto in 1970 by Judith Merril. This public library collection contains over 63,000 items, including books, magazines, audiovisual works, original manuscripts, and other items of interest to both casual users and academic researchers.

Paul Allen and Jody Patton founded the Science Fiction Museum and Hall of Fame in 2004, located at the base of Space Needle in Seattle. Prominent authors such as Greg Bear serve as advisers to the museum.

An important museum of the genre is Maison d’Ailleurs ("House of Elsewhere") in Yverdon-les-Bains, Switzerland, housing a large collection of literature relating to science fiction, utopias, and extraordinary journeys. It was founded by the French encyclopedist Pierre Versins in 1976 and now owns over 70,000 books, as well as many other items (60,000) related to science fiction and its imagery.

List of archives, libraries, museums, and collections

Research collections
 Jack Williamson Science Fiction Library lending library of over 20,000 volumes of speculative fiction at Eastern New Mexico University. Includes archival materials from authors.
 J. Lloyd Eaton Collection of Science Fiction, Fantasy, Horror, and Utopian Literature (University of California, Riverside) (Collection description)
 The Science Fiction Foundation Collection, Special Collections and Archives, Sydney Jones Library, University of Liverpool
 M. Horvat Collection of Science Fiction Fanzines, University of Iowa Libraries, Special Collections Dept.
H.G Wells Literary Papers at The Rare Book & Manuscript Library (University of Illinois at Urbana-Champaign)
 The Judith Merril Collection of Science Fiction, Speculation and Fantasy, Toronto Public Library (founded 1970)
 Michigan State University Libraries, Science Fiction Collection; includes collection of Tiptree Award, Clarion archives, and Science Fiction Writers of America depository
 MIT Science Fiction Society ("the world's largest open-shelf collection of science fiction"); local index
 Caltech S.P.E.C.T.R.E. lending library of over 12,000 volumes of speculative fiction at the California Institute of Technology
 Paskow Science Fiction Collection, Temple University Libraries (Philadelphia, Pennsylvania), including a significant collection of fanzines
 University of Maryland Baltimore County, ca. 10,000 book volumes and serials, and the Coslet Collection of 15,000 SF fanzines
 Maison d’Ailleurs ("House of Elsewhere"), Yverdon-les-Bains, Switzerland (founded 1976 and holding more than 40,000 books and other items) 
Science Fiction and Fantasy Writers of America Collection Northern Illinois University. Science Fiction Writers of America depository, pulps, and collects the papers of current SF authors.
 University of Delaware's Special Collections, including the "Roland Bounds Science Fiction Collection" (30,000 volumes)
 Georgia Tech's "Bud Foote Science Fiction Collection" (established 1999; 8,000+ volumes)
 Texas A&M University's  "Science Fiction and Fantasy Research Collection" (More than 20,000 titles and "over ninety percent of the American science fiction pulp magazines published prior to 1980")
 San Diego State University's "Elizabeth Chater Collection of Science Fiction and Fantasy" 
 Seoul Science Fiction & Fantasy Library
Science Fiction Collections at the University of South Florida
Science Fiction Collections at the Kenneth Spencer Research Library, University of Kansas
Phantastische Bibliothek Wetzlar, Germany (270,000 volumes of speculative fiction, mainly in German, including a significant collection of pulp magazines and fanzines)
Villa Fantastica, Vienna, Austria public library founded 2010 by :de:Helmuth W. Mommers, holding 50,000 volumes mainly in German, including a broad collection of German "Dime Novels"
 University of Oslo Science Library (8,000 volumes of science fiction )
Murdoch University Science Fiction Collection (including over 13,000 book titles and a significant number of fanzines)
J. Francis McComas Science Fiction Collection, San Francisco Public Library
The University of Alabama in Huntsville Special Collections and Archives collects science fiction in English and German and has archival collections from Willy Ley and Robert Forward. 
City Tech Science Fiction Collection, Ursula C. Schwerin Library, New York City College of Technology 

 Popular culture collections with strong SF
 Bowling Green State University Popular Culture Collection
 Dime Novel and Story Paper Collection, Stanford University Library ("Dime Novels and Penny Dreadfuls")

Museums
 Science Fiction Museum and Hall of Fame, Seattle, Washington, founded in 2004. 
 Maison d’Ailleurs ("House of Elsewhere"), Yverdon-les-Bains, Switzerland (founded 1976 and holding more than 70,000 books and 60,000 other items)
 Museum of Science Fiction, Washington, DC, founded in 2013 with a goal of becoming the world's first comprehensive science fiction museum.

Important databases and portals
 SF Hub, the University of Liverpool Library's "Science Fiction Foundation" collection
 Center for the Study of Science Fiction, University of Kansas
 ISFDB, the Internet Speculative Fiction DataBase
 Locus Index to Science Fiction (1984-1999)
 Map of major SF Archival Collections maintained by The Eaton Journal of Archival Research in Science Fiction
 SF Archival Collections Wiki, a growing wiki of the locations of SF writers' papers, crowd-sourced by librarians.

References

Libraries and museums
Libraries and museums
Libraries and museums
Museum collections
Lists of museums by subject
Museums in popular culture
Types of museums
Libraries by subject